Tamás Molnár, or Thomas Molnar may refer to:

Tamás Molnár (born 1975), a Hungarian water polo player
Tamás Molnár (powerlifter) (born 1975), a powerlifter and world champion
Tamás Molnár (sprinter) (born 1968), a Hungarian former sprinter

See also
Tamás (name), Tamás is a Hungarian, masculine given name. It is a Hungarian equivalent of the name Thomas 
Thomas Molnar (1921-2010), Thomas Steven Molnar, a Catholic philosopher, historian and political theorist.